The 2018 Naiste Meistriliiga was the 26th season of women's league football in Estonia. The season was played between 31 March 2018 and 10 November 2018. Flora won their first Estonian league title and qualified for the Champions League.

Format
The eight teams played each other twice, for a total of 14 matches, with the top four teams qualifying for a championship round and the bottom four teams playing a relegation round.

Regular season

Championship round

Relegation round

Playoff 

First leg

Second leg

Tammeka won 5–1 on aggregate and remain in the Naiste Meistriliiga.

References 

Estonia
Estonia
2018 in Estonian football
Naiste Meistriliiga